The Ras Cannons were the first cannons built in South Africa. The two cannons were constructed during the First Boer War on a farm Bokfontein in Brits district.

They were built during a two-week period by Marthinus Nikolaas Ras, who is considered the father of South African Artillery, and his cousin, Eduard Dawid Ras who was a talented blacksmith.

In December 1880, Ras requested and obtained permission from General Piet Cronjé to return home to his farm Bokfontein, near Brits, to build a cannon for the Boer forces.

"Martienie" Cannon

Marthinus Nikolaas Ras bought a number of iron shod wagon wheels from a dealer in Rustenburg, which were melted down and from which the cannons were cast.

The first cannon, a 3-inch caliber named "Martienie" after Marthinus Ras, fired a 7-pound lead ball from a 4½ feet barrel. The breech plug of the cannon was damaged during the first test firing of the cannon, which necessitated some adjustments from the manufacturer. The damaged cannon breech was replaced by a reinforced breech (see picture) and the cannon was then mounted on a small wagon axle and wheels.

The "Martienie" cannon was moved to the front and deployed by Commandant Eloff against the British garrison at Rustenburg. It was first fired from 2000 feet, then later from 800 and 600 feet. Between the 8 and 9 January 1881 it was used to fire 93 shots on the British fort, which led to the subsequent surrender of the fort.

"Ras" Cannon
The second cannon, built at a later stage, was dubbed "Ras". It was smaller than "Martienie", being a 2-inch caliber, but which had a longer barrel, 5½ feet long. It was designed to fire an elongated bullet shaped projectile (2 inches wide and 4½ inches long). However, it was never operationally deployed during the war.

After the war “Ras” was sent as an exhibit to Europe and was displayed at the 1900 World Fair in Paris. It was only returned to South Africa after the Second Boer War.

After the war
The “Martienie” cannon was used after the war to fire the noon signal in Pretoria.

In 1885 a mad Austrian named Compolier loaded the cannon with rocks, aimed and fired it at the State Presidential residence in Pretoria. The shot severely damaged the cannon, and it was subsequently moved to a museum. When the British marched into Pretoria in 1900, it was already a museum piece, otherwise it would probably have met the same fate as the other Boer war cannons, which were sent to England to be melted down.

The two Ras cannons survive today. "Ras" is displayed at Fort Schanskop in Pretoria, and "Martienie" at Denel in Erasmuskloof, Pretoria.

Honours
After the Second World War, the 26 Field Artillery Regiment of the South African Transvaal Artillery gunner regiments, named their two senior batteries "MARTIENIE" and "RAS" after the two homemade cannons built by Martinus Ras. He was further honoured in 1981 by the regiment, by the firing of a Salute at a memorial service to celebrate the achievements of the gunmaker, 100 years after the manufacture of the first gun.

Notes

Sources

Ras
First Boer War
Weapon history
Artillery of South Africa